A mollete is a type of bread in Spanish cuisine, or an open-faced sandwich with beans and cheese in Mexican cuisine.

In Spanish cuisine

A  is a flatbread from the Andalusian region, in southern Spain. It is a soft round white bread, usually served lightly toasted with olive oil and raw garlic or spread with lard (usually in the forms of manteca colorá or ) in an Andalusian breakfast. The most famous are the ones from Antequera, Málaga.

In Mexican cuisine

A , native to Mexico City, is made with  sliced lengthwise and partially hollowed, filled with refried beans, and topped with cheese and slices of jalapeño or serrano peppers. It is then grilled in an oven until the cheese melts.  The refried beans are "" (literally, "butter beans") known outside of the region as "pinto beans".

The traditional cheeses used are queso ranchero, or queso menonita. The queso ranchero is most similar to Parmesan with less aging, the asadero is a creamy provolone, and the menonita most closely resembles Havarti.

There is also a "sweet type" , made of a buttered  sprinkled with sugar or honey and broiled until crisp.

Molletes as a breakfast 
Molletes can also be eaten as a simple, inexpensive and adequate breakfast.

See also

References

Mexican cuisine
Spanish cuisine
Yeast breads
Legume dishes
Cheese sandwiches
Open-faced sandwiches
Hot sandwiches